El Cóndor en Nueva York is a 2018 Peruvian superhero film directed by Alejandro Nieto-Polo and written by Nieto-Polo, José Luis Ruiz & Jorge Cerna. It is a sequel of the 2015 Peruvian film Super Cóndor.

Cast 
The actors participating in this film are:

 Gerardo Zamora as Pedro 'El Condor'
 Jose Luis Ruiz as Jorge Martinez
 Matthew Cullipher as Damian Dimitri
 Angelo Paravalos as Frank Smith
 Ricardo J. Salazar as Agent Ramirez
 Yesi Rodriguez as Agent Rogers
 Ivan Andia as Agent Fernandez
 Lucio Fernandez as Fernando Valenzuela
 Asier Kintana as Juan Jimenez
 Ivana Loli as Claudia Smith

Production 
Filming lasted 20 days in different locations throughout New York City. 90% of the total film was shot in New York City.

Release 
El Cóndor en Nueva York was released on September 15, 2018, in theaters in the United States and Mexico. On January 15 and 16, 2021, it arrived at Peruvian drive-ins.

References

External links 

 
 Official Page

2018 films
2018 fantasy films
2018 action films
2010s superhero films
Peruvian superhero films
Peruvian fantasy films
Peruvian action films
Nima Producciones films
2010s Spanish-language films
2010s English-language films
2010s Peruvian films
Films shot in New York City
Films set in New York City
Films set in Peru
Films shot in Peru
Films about drugs
Peruvian sequel films